is the second tallest mountain in the Kitami Mountains. It is located on the border of Kamikawa and Engaru, Hokkaidō, Japan.

References
 Geographical Survey Institute

Mountains of Hokkaido